Operation Success is a prime time public affairs television program broadcast on the now-defunct DuMont Television Network.

Broadcast history
The program aired from September 1948 to June 1949, Tuesdays at 8pm EST, opposite Texaco Star Theater with Milton Berle. Each 30-minute episode was hosted by Bob Pfeiffer, who was also the announcer for some episodes of Captain Video.

The series consisted of host Bob Pfeiffer and others interviewing disabled war veterans and then asking viewers to come forward with job offers. The program claimed to have found jobs for one-hundred-percent of the veterans. DuMont aired a similar series Operation Information from July to September 1952.

Episode status
Two episodes are in the collection of the Paley Center for Media.

See also
List of programs broadcast by the DuMont Television Network
List of surviving DuMont Television Network broadcasts
1948-49 United States network television schedule

Bibliography
David Weinstein, The Forgotten Network: DuMont and the Birth of American Television (Philadelphia: Temple University Press, 2004) 
Alex McNeil, Total Television, Fourth edition (New York: Penguin Books, 1980) 
Tim Brooks and Earle Marsh, The Complete Directory to Prime Time Network TV Shows, Third edition (New York: Ballantine Books, 1964)

External links
 
 DuMont historical website

DuMont Television Network original programming
1948 American television series debuts
1949 American television series endings
Black-and-white American television shows
English-language television shows
DuMont news programming